Established in 1869 on the grounds of Vyšehrad Castle in Prague, Czech Republic, the Vyšehrad Cemetery is the final resting place of many composers, artists, sculptors, writers, and those from the world of science and politics. The centerpiece of the cemetery is the Slavín tomb designed by Antonín Wiehl, a large and notable tomb located within Vyšehrad cemetery.

Notable interments
Some of the famous Czechs interred here:
 Mikoláš Aleš (1852–1913), painter
 Karel Ančerl (1908–1973), conductor of the Czech Philharmonic Orchestra and Toronto Symphony Orchestra
 Josef Bican (1913–2001), footballer
 Josef Čapek (1887–1945), painter and writer (cenotaph)
 Karel Čapek (1890–1938), writer
 Antonin Chittussi (1847–1891), painter
 Emmy Destinn (Ema Destinnová, 1878–1930), opera singer
 Antonín Dvořák (1841–1904), composer
 Ludmila Dvořáková  (1923–2015) opera singer
 Petr Eben (1929–2007), composer and organist
 Zdeněk Fibich (1850–1900), composer
 Vlastimil Fišar (1926–1991), composer
 Eduard Haken (1910–1996), operatic bass
 Jaroslav Heyrovský (1890–1967), Nobel prize winning founder of polarography
 Milada Horáková (1901–1950), doctor, victim of 1950s Czechoslovak communist party show trials (cenotaph)
 František Hrubín (1910–1971), writer and poet, friend of Jaroslav Seifert
 Ivan Jandl (1937–1987), actor
 Rafael Kubelík (1914–1996), conductor and composer
 Vilém Kurz (1872–1945), pianist and piano teacher
 Karel Hynek Mácha (1810–1836), romantic poet
 Hana Mašková (1949–1972), figure skater
 Waldemar Matuška (1932–2009), singer and actor
 Alphonse Mucha (1860–1939), artist and designer
 Josef Václav Myslbek (1848–1922), sculptor
 Jan Neruda (1834–1891), poet and writer
 Božena Němcová (1820–1862), writer, author of the novel Babička ("The Grandmother")
 Zdeněk Nejedlý (1878–1962), musicologist, critic, and Communist politician
 František Ondříček (1857–1922), violinist and composer
 Otakar Ostrčil (1879–1935), composer and conductor of the National Theater
 Zdenka Procházková 1926–2021, actress
 Jan Evangelista Purkyně (1787–1869), anatomist and physiologist, known for the Purkinje effect and Purkinje cells
 Jana Rybářová (1936–1957), actress
 Ladislav Šaloun (1870–1946), Art Nouveau sculptor
 Olga Scheinpflugová (1902–1968), actress and wife of Karel Čapek
 Václav Smetáček (1906–1998), composer and oboist
 Bedřich Smetana (1824–1884), composer
 Pavel Štěpán (1925–1998), pianist and piano teacher
 Ilona Štěpánová-Kurzová (1899–1975), pianist and piano teacher
 Josef Suk (1929–2011), violinist and grandson of composer Josef Suk
 Max Švabinský (1873–1962), painter
 Vladislav Vančura (1891–1942), avant-garde writer and filmmaker 
 Helena Zmatlíková (1923–2005), illustrator

References

External links

 Longer list of famous people buried there
 Transcripts of Headstones
 

19th-century establishments in Bohemia
1869 establishments in Austria-Hungary
Cemeteries in Prague
Religion in Prague
Tourist attractions in Prague
19th-century architecture in the Czech Republic